Index maps are a type of finding aid that enables users to find a set of maps covering their regions of interest along with the name or number of the relevant map sheet.  An index map provides geospatial data on either a sheet of paper or a computer screen. In this way, a map acts as a kind of gazetteer, with the location (such as a call number) represented within a grid overlaying the map's surface.

One important reason for using geospatial data instead of political borders is because the latter often change. Information is searched by coordinates, rather than the metadata for a particular country and region that can be entered into a catalog. Additionally, in various institutions, maps are sometimes cataloged individually or as sets, resulting in various levels of specificity.

References

Index (publishing)
Map types